Country Life Acres is a village in St. Louis County, Missouri, United States. The population was 74 at the 2010 census.

Geography
Country Life Acres is located at  (38.624802, -90.456051).

Demographics

2010 census
At the 2010 census there were 74 people, 27 households, and 24 families living in the village. The racial makeup of the village was 95.9% White and 4.1% Asian. Hispanic or Latino of any race were 1.4%.

Of the 27 households 22.2% had children under the age of 18 living with them, 81.5% were married couples living together, 3.7% had a female householder with no husband present, 3.7% had a male householder with no wife present, and 11.1% were non-families. 11.1% of households were one person and 7.4% were one person aged 65 or older. The average household size was 2.74 and the average family size was 2.96.

The median age in the village was 49 years. 20.3% of residents were under the age of 18; 6.9% were between the ages of 18 and 24; 12.2% were from 25 to 44; 33.8% were from 45 to 64; and 27% were 65 or older. The gender makeup of the village was 47.3% male and 52.7% female.

2000 census
At the 2000 census there were 81 people, 27 households, and 22 families living in the village. The racial makeup of the village was 93.83% White, 1.23% African American and 4.94% Asian. Hispanic or Latino of any race were 7.41%.

Of the 27 households 40.7% had children under the age of 18 living with them, 77.8% were married couples living together, 3.7% had a female householder with no husband present, and 18.5% were non-families. 14.8% of households were one person and 14.8% were one person aged 65 or older. The average household size was 3.00 and the average family size was 3.36.

The age distribution was 23.5% under the age of 18, 9.9% from 18 to 24, 14.8% from 25 to 44, 40.7% from 45 to 64, and 11.1% 65 or older. The median age was 47 years. For every 100 females, there were 92.9 males. For every 100 females age 18 and over, there were 93.8 males.

The median household income was $193,271 and the median family income  was $200,000. Males had a median income of $100,000 versus $60,833 for females. The per capita income for the village was $100,617. There were no families and 3.3% of the population living below the poverty line, including no under eighteens and none of those over 64.

References

Villages in St. Louis County, Missouri
Villages in Missouri